The 1975 NCAA Division I baseball tournament was played at the end of the 1975 NCAA Division I baseball season to determine the national champion of college baseball.  The tournament concluded with eight teams competing in the College World Series, a double-elimination tournament in its twenty-ninth year.  Eight regional competitions were held to determine the participants in the final event.  Each region held a four team, double-elimination tournament, resulting in 32 teams participating in the tournament at the conclusion of their regular season, and in some cases, after a conference tournament.  The twenty-ninth tournament's champion was Texas, coached by Cliff Gustafson, their first in a quarter-century. The Most Outstanding Player was Mickey Reichenbach of Texas. This was the first year the tournament used the regionals.

The 1975 tournament marked the first appearance for LSU, which would become a college baseball superpower in the succeeding decades, claiming six national championships between 1991 and 2009. LSU won the 1961 Southeastern Conference championship to earn an automatic bid to the NCAA tournament, but declined the bid to avoid playing integrated teams.

This season also marked the first appearance for Cal State Fullerton, which would claim four national championships from 1979 through 2004.  Head coach Augie Garrido guided the Titans to three titles before moving to Texas, where he claimed three more titles from 2002 through 2009.

Regionals
1975 was the first year the NCAA featured the Regional format for the tournament, which is still in use today, although it has been modified.

Northeast Regional
Games played in Stamford, CT.

Atlantic Regional
Games played in Columbia, SC.

Mideast Regional
Games played in Ypsilanti, MI.

South Regional
Games played in Starkville, MS.

Midwest Regional
Games played in Norman, OK.

South Central Regional
Games played in Arlington, TX.

Rocky Mountain Regional
Games played in Tempe, AZ.

West Regional
Games played in Los Angeles.

College World Series
Seton Hall, South Carolina, Eastern Michigan, Florida St., Oklahoma, Texas, Arizona St. and Cal St. Fullerton won their regionals and moved on to the 1975 College World Series.

Participants

Results

Bracket

Game results

All-Tournament Team
The following players were members of the All-Tournament Team.

Notable players
 Arizona State: Gary Allenson, Chris Bando, Floyd Bannister, Mike Colbern, Dave Hudgens, Darrell Jackson, Ken Landreaux, Jerry Maddox, Chris Nyman, Rick Peters, Ken Phelps, John Poloni, Gary Rajsich
 Cal State Fullerton: Danny Boone, George Horton
 Eastern Michigan: Glenn Gulliver, John Martin, Bob Owchinko, Bob Welch
 Florida State: Juan Bonilla, Craig Eaton, Mark Gilbert, Terry Kennedy, Carlos Lezcano, Dan O'Brien
 Oklahoma: Terry Bogener, Keith Drumright, George Frazier, Roger LaFrancois, Bob Shirley
 Seton Hall: Rick Cerone, Dan Morogiello, Charlie Puleo
 South Carolina: Garry Hancock, Greg Keatley, Ed Lynch, Jim Pankovits, Hank Small
 Texas: Jim Gideon, Don Kainer, Keith Moreland, Rich Wortham

Tournament Notes
The Arizona State team featured 13 future Major League players – a record matched by the school's team from the following year.

Texas came back to win the CWS after losing in Game 7 to Arizona State.

See also
 1975 NCAA Division II baseball tournament
 1975 NAIA World Series

References

NCAA Division I Baseball Championship
tournament
Baseball in the Dallas–Fort Worth metroplex